Darrel Keith Lewis is an American and Icelandic professional basketball player who last played for Þór Akureyri in the Icelandic Úrvalsdeild karla. He was named the Úrvalsdeild Foreign Player of the year in 2004 and selected to the Domestic All-First Team in 2015.

Lewis has reached the Úrvalsdeild finals twice, in 2003 with Grindavík and in 2015 with Tindastóll.

College career
Lewis played for Lincoln University from 1996 to 1999 and ended his career there as the schools the all-time leading scorer with 2,294 points. He was inducted into the Lincoln Lions Athletic Hall of Fame in 2013.

National team career
Lewis became an Icelandic citizen in December 2004 and was selected to the Icelandic national basketball team in 2005. He played four games during the 2005 Games of the Small States of Europe.

References

External links 
Stats in Iceland (2002–2005) at kki.is
Stats in Iceland (2012-present) at kki.is
Italy stats at legaduebasket.it
Darrel Lewis at realgm.com

1976 births
Living people
AEK B.C. players
American expatriate basketball people in Greece
American expatriate basketball people in Iceland
American expatriate basketball people in Italy
American men's basketball players
American emigrants to Iceland
Darrel Lewis
Guards (basketball)
Darrel Lewis
Darrel Lewis
Darrel Lewis
Ikaros B.C. players
Darrel Lewis
OFI Crete B.C. players
People from Coatesville, Pennsylvania
Peristeri B.C. players
Sporting basketball players
Darrel Lewis
Darrel Lewis
Darrel Lewis